Kampala International University School of Health Sciences is the school of health sciences of Kampala International University, a private Ugandan university. The school provides health sciences education at the diploma, undergraduate and postgraduate levels.

Location

The campus is also called Kampala International University Western Campus, to distinguish it from Kampala International University Main Campus located in Kansanga, Makindye Division, Kampala. The coordinates of Kampala International University's Western Campus are:0°32'19.0"S,  30°08'40.0"E (Latitude:-0.538611; Longitude:30.144444).

Overview
The school was established in 2004 and admitted the first batch of students that year. Those pioneer students, numbering twenty-three, graduated in 2010. The students at the school come from Uganda and other African countries, especially Kenya. The school is licensed to teach undergraduate and postgraduate courses in Human Medicine, Dentistry, Pharmacy and Nursing. KIU School of Health Sciences is recognised by the medical and dental licensing boards in Kenya, Tanzania and Uganda. Faculty are sourced from Uganda, Cuba, Democratic Republic of the Congo, Nigeria and the Philippines.

Teaching hospitals

The school is affiliated with the following hospitals, for the purposes of teaching its students:

 KIU Teaching Hospital - Ishaka
 Fort Portal Regional Referral Hospital - Fort Portal
 Hoima Regional Referral Hospital - Hoima
 Mubende Regional Referral Hospital - Mubende
Jinja Regional Referral Hospital -Jinja
 Kiryandongo General Hospital - Kiryandongo

Academic departments
The school maintains the following faculties:

 Faculty of Medicine
 Faculty of Pharmacy
 Faculty of Dentistry
 Faculty of Nursing
 Faculty of Social Science

Diploma courses
The following diploma courses are offered at KIU Western Campus:

Diploma in Clinical Medicine and Community Health (Dip.CM&CH
Diploma in Nursing Science] (Dip.NS)
Diploma in Pharmacy (Dip.Pharm)
Diploma in Medical Laboratory Technology (DMLT)

Undergraduate courses
The following degrees are offered:

 Bachelor of Medicine and Bachelor of Surgery (MBChB)
 Bachelor of Pharmacy (B.Pharm)
 Bachelor of Science in Nursing (BSN)
 Bachelor of Science in Clinical Medicine & Community Health. (BSc.CMCH)
 Bachelor of Medical Laboratory Technology (BMLT)
 Bachelor of Science in Anatomy (Bsc.Anat)
 Bachelor of Science in Physiology (BSc.Physiol)
 Bachelor of Science in Biochemistry (BSc.BC)
 Bachelor of Science in Pharmacology (BSc.Pharmcol)

Postgraduate courses

, the school offers the following postgraduate courses:

 Master of Science in Microbiology (MSc.Microbiol.)
 Master of Science in Human Anatomy (MSc.Anat.)
 Master of Science in Physiology (MSc.Physiol.
 Master of Science in Biochemistry (MSc.Biochem.) 
 Master of Science in Pharmacology (MSc.Pharmacol.) 
 Master of Science in Public Health (MSc.Pub.Hlth.)
 Master of Medicine in Internal Medicine (M.Med.Med.)
 Master of Medicine in Surgery (M.Med.Surg.)
 Master of Medicine in Paediatrics & Child Health (M.Med.Paed.)
 Master of Medicine in Obstetrics & Gynaecology (M.Med.Obs/Gyn.)

Photos
Photo of KIU Western Campus In 2009

See also

Notable people
 Quex - Ugandan artist

References

External links
 KIU Medical Students Present Research Paper At Lusaka Conference

Medical schools in Uganda
Kampala International University
Educational institutions established in 2004
2004 establishments in Uganda
Teaching hospitals in Uganda